Nenad Stojaković (born April 4, 1980) is a Serbian football midfielder.

He had previously played with Serbian clubs Partizan Belgrade, FK Teleoptik and FK Budućnost Banatski Dvor, Montenegrin FK Mogren and FK Rudar Pljevlja, Bosnian FK Rudar Ugljevik, Greek PAOK FC, Iranian Shirin Faraz F.C., Hungarian Budapest Honvéd, Vietnamese Sông Lam Nghệ An and Radnički Kragujevac.

References
 Profile and stats at Srbijafudbal
 Nenad Stojaković Stats at Utakmica.rs

1980 births
Living people
Footballers from Belgrade
Serbian footballers
Serbian expatriate footballers
FK Partizan players
FK Teleoptik players
FK Mogren players
FK Rudar Pljevlja players
FK Rad players
FK Budućnost Banatski Dvor players
FK Radnički 1923 players
FK Smederevo players
Serbian SuperLiga players
PAOK FC players
Expatriate footballers in Greece
Shirin Faraz Kermanshah players
Expatriate footballers in Iran
Budapest Honvéd FC players
Expatriate footballers in Hungary
Expatriate footballers in Vietnam
Nemzeti Bajnokság I players
Premier League of Bosnia and Herzegovina players
Association football midfielders